Fabrika Zvyozd (literally "Factory of stars"), sometimes known internationally as Star Factory, is a popular Russian television talent show that aired on Channel One from 2002 until 2007. It was the Russian version of the Endemol format Operación Triunfo. In 2011, the show announced that it would be returning with an eighth, All-Star season and in 2012 for the ninth season with the format Star Factory: Russia vs. Ukraine. The programme then went on a hiatus for five years before relaunching the tenth season in 2017 broadcast on Muz-TV. Nine out of the ten season were hosted by Yana Churikova and one by Ksenia Sobchak.

Fabrika Zvyozd, meaning Star Factory, honoured its name in Russia. From the contestants, called "fabrikanty" (Russian: фабриканты), many have established successful careers in the Russian-language music world. The show's alumni include Polina Gagarina, Fabrika, Zara, Irina Dubtsova, Timati, Yulia Savicheva, Natalia Podolskaya, Dmitry Koldun, Anastasia Prikhodko, and Elena Temnikova. The show also had a tight connection with the Eurovision Song Contest. In total, seven past fabrikanty sang at the contest at some stage between 2004 and 2019.

Throughout its runtime, Fabrika Zvyozd was successful in its ratings. In 2006, the show was so popular that producers decided to prolong the season with one whole month mid-season. This decision was regarded controversial, because contestants had to stay inside the house against their wishes for an extra month. The 2017 series was less successful in its ratings and finished its final with a market share of 1.3%.

Fabrika Zvyozd gained a cult status in Russia. It was the first real Russian reality music competition and the first reality show on Channel One Russia. Although it was axed in 2007 in favour of Interzvezda, which was later cancelled in its production phase, the show and its contestants stayed popular long after its axing. In 2017, Channel One Russia featured a special two-week special of Segodnya vecherom about Fabrika Zvyozd, celebrating the show's fifteenth anniversary. The episodes mostly focused on the contestants’ fate after the show.

In 2020, the show became popular on the internet due to the lockdown in Russia as a result of the COVID-19 pandemic. In August 2020, Channel One Russia made a four-hour long special broadcast on Fabrika Zvyozd on the television programme Segodnya vecherom, hosted by Maksim Galkin and Yana Churikova. In this programme, a large share of the successful contestants were re-invited to look back on their memories of the time they were on the show. Next to that, Channel One rebroadcast a selection of some of the best performances in the show's history in primetime slots. The broadcasts solely focused on the first seven series, neglecting the revival version that was produced by Muz-TV.

On 9 January 2022, the producer of the tenth season of the show, Yulia Sumacheva, confirmed that the show is set to return in 2022.

Format

Similarly to Operación Triunfo, in Fabrika Zvyozd a selection of young potential musical stars is boarded in a house together. In this house, they are constantly monitored by cameras, an idea borrowed from another of Endemol's major reality shows Big Brother. In the house, they are "produced" or "manufactured" by an important Russian producer to become household names in the Russian music world once the show is over. In daily summary programmes, viewers are informed about the daily activities of the contestants.

After an “opening ceremony” in the first week, every single week, the contestants come together during a so-called “reporting concert” on Saturday to show their progress. Each show, one of the contestants gets dropped until a handful remain for the final.

The Monday before each concert, three contestants are nominated to be eliminated. These three nominees sing solo numbers on the Friday or Saturday show, while the safe contestants usually sing duets with famous artists. The nominations are based on the verdicts of the producers and can be either a good or a bad sign. At times, nominations are awarded because producers want to see a well-performing contestant sing a solo number, while other times, the weaker contestants are nominated. In rare cases, contestants are nominated for displaying poor behaviour.

From Monday to Saturday, viewers can vote for their favourite among the nominations. The winner of the televoting gets an automatic pass to stay in the house. The safe contestants determine themselves who gets the final pass to stay and who gets eliminated. Once per season, the producer is allowed to save a contestant from elimination as a veto right, although not all producers have exercised this privilege. Additionally, the audience chooses their favourite overall performer, who receives a prize.

In the original run of the show, the final concert was held in the Olympic Stadium in Moscow. In this concert, all of the contestants of the season would return to perform the best songs of the season once again. In 2007, the last series of the original run, the producers opted to hold the final in the usual television studio at the Ostankino Technical Center instead, as all other episodes were taped there. The 2017 revival's final was also held in a television studio rather than in the Olympic Stadium.

Series overview

First season (2002)

The very first series of Fabrika Zvyozd was commissioned by Channel One with the interest of Igor Matvienko, who wanted to create a new platform for young musical talent after Morning Star had ended a year earlier. Although auditions were held across Russia, most of the contestants of the first series of Fabrika Zvyozd had been recruited elsewhere. Yulia Buzhilova had already been working with Igor Matvienko prior to the season's debut. During the first episode, all contestants and star duet partners sang live, unlike later seasons of the show.

The first season of the show knew two incidents. During the second concert, singer Yuriy Antonov and contestant Nikolay Burlak were supposed to open the concert, but Antonov had felt insulted by the young Burlak asking him: “Are you the one that sings with me tonight?” to which Antonov answered that he did not want to perform with Burlak anymore. Eventually, the producers persuaded Antonov to perform with Burlak, but they rescheduled the duet to a later moment in the show. During the third concert, the first black contestant of the show, Sherif Musa, was voted away after facing the contestants’ vote. In later interviews, he noted that several contestants had made racist comments towards the colour of his skin.

The final of the show took place in May 2002 in the Olympic Stadium in Moscow. Prior to the final, Matvienko decided that Artemiev, Astashenok, Berdnikov and Kabanov were to form a boyband, while Kazanova, Toneva, Savelyeva and Alalykina were to form a girl group. Unlike other seasons, the final result was not determined on the basis of televoting, but rather by the producers. For finishing third, Mikhail Grebenshikov received an apartment in Moscow. Fabrika received a minibus for finishing second. Winners Korni received a recording deal, a tour through Russia, a microphone and the opportunity to represent Russia at Eurobest in Paris.

After the show, Korni and Fabrika became breakout successes. While Fabrika stayed popular in the Russian-speaking world, the popularity of Korni gradually declined, especially after Artemiev and Astashenok left the group. Sati Kazanova left Fabrika in 2010, establishing a solo career. Most of the participants of the first season of Fabrika Zvyozd went into oblivion.

Producer: Igor Matvienko

Second season (Early 2003)
The second series of the show was commissioned after the first series received overall great ratings and the producers wanted to continue to support new opportunities for young talented Russian singers. The second series was led by producer Maxim Fadeev, starting on 6 March 2003. Similar to the first series, Fadeev recruited several artists by himself and invited them on a personal basis. Oxana Fedorova was given an offer to host but she declined.

The final of the show took place in the Olympic Stadium in Moscow on 11 June 2003. For finishing third, Elena Temnikova received the microphone she used during the length of the series. Yelena Terleyeva was promised an album and several music videos. Polina Gagarina was allowed to represent Russia at the international festival Worldbest in Paris. However, Gagarina refused to sign a contract with Fadeev and instead, Yulia Savicheva was sent to the festival.

Producer: Maxim Fadeev

Third season (Late 2003)

The third season was led by producer Alexander Shulgin. Initially, both Ivan Shapovalov and Alla Pugacheva had been rumoured to be the season's producer. The third Fabrika Zvyozd became infamous for the inclusion of children of famous Russian singers. The show included Nikita Malinin, the son of Alexander Malinin, Sofiya Kuzmina, the daughter of Vladimir Kuzmin and Nikolai Slichenko Jr, the grandson of Nikolai Slichenko. According to an editor at the time, they had chosen them because it would be more interesting for the viewers to see familiar names.  The season ran from 5 September until 12 December 2003, when the season was completed with a final concert held in the Olympic Stadium in Moscow.

For winning the third season, Nikita Malinin received a music video and the opportunity to sing at a festival. Kireev received the proposal to record a solo album from Shulgin and received a piano from the producers at Channel One. For finishing third, Yulia Mikhalchik received the proposal to record an album and release a music video. During the final, Yulia Mikhalchik received a wedding proposal from Shulgin. However, the wedding proposal was cut in the Moscow version of the broadcast.

The third season of the show became the most popular of all three seasons shot so far at that moment.  However, the songs were noted to be weaker than in the previous series. Being unhappy with that, Channel One decided to let the contestants be signed with musical producers Viktor Drobysh and Iosif Prigozhin in the end. Viktor Drobysh scouted Kireev, Golubev and Barsukov to create the group K.G.B. and invited Yaroslavskaya, Ortman, Veber and Krainova to form the girlband Tootsie.

Producer: Alexander Shulgin

Fourth season (Early 2004)

The fourth season of the show was led by Igor Krutoy, one of the founders of New Wave. However, Viktor Drobysh and Igor Nikolaev were also involved in the creative direction of the season as Krutoy could not take the heavy workload on his own.  Initially, Evgeniy Orlov was supposed to work together with Krutoy as a co-producer, but after a dispute between the two, Krutoy took the leadership of the season on himself without Orlov. It was the first season that the veto right for producers was used, as Krutoy saved Irina Dubtsova during the ninth concert.

Unlike previous seasons, the fourth season had 18 contestants instead of 16. A few contestants were already known prior to the show, including Dominik Joker, Timati, Edita Piekha’s grandson Stas Piekha and Irina Dubtsova, who had sung in the girl group Devochki. Similar to the two previous seasons, almost all performances were playbacked. Ksenia Sobchak had auditioned for this season of Fabrika Zvyozd, but did not make it past the auditions.

The show started on 12 March and finalised its season on 11 June 2004 with a concert in the Olympic Arena. For winning the season, Dubtsova received a Peugeot cabriolet, an album and two music videos. She was also allowed to represent Russia at New Wave that same year. Zatsepin received a car, an album and two music videos. For finishing third, Piekha received an album, two music videos and a motorbike. Krutoy and Drobysh also awarded special prizes to Aleksa, who received the opportunity to record a studio album, Yuriy Titov and Banda, who received an album and a music video, and Ksenia Larina, who received a microphone.

The show came under fire in April 2004 after two contestants had an intimate relationship and performed sexual acts live on television. Earlier, the show had published a promotional photoshoot in which the contestants had posed naked.

15-year-old Aleksa from Donetsk became the most widely discussed participant of the fourth season. Aleksa showed herself non-participative at several times, hiding from guest star Lara Fabian by climbing underneath her bed.  In the house, she pursued a romantic relationship with Timati, which was widely discussed in the press. Meanwhile, the season attracted media attention when the boyfriend of Irina Dubtsova proposed to her during one of the concerts and their wedding took place mid-season.

Ratmir Shishkov was the first Fabrika Zvyozd contestant to die after being killed in a car crash at the age of 18 in March 2007.

Producer: Igor Krutoy

Fifth season (Late 2004)

Producers: Alla Pugacheva, Igor Matvienko, Maxim Fadeev

Sixth season (2006)

Producer: Viktor Drobysh

Seventh season (2007)

The seventh season was sponsored by singer Alla Pugacheva,  together with Maxim Galkin and Verka Serduchka.

Spares:
Elena Mizuk
Vitaliy Chirva
Leonid Panov
Yulia Zemskaya

Producers: Konstantin Meladze, Valery Meladze

All stars season (2011)
On March 12, 2011, Channel One debuted an eight-week all-stars season of the show, called Fabrika Zyozd. Vozvryashchenie (Фабрика звёзд. Возвращение, literally Fabrika Zyozd. The return).   It was not strictly competition of new talent, but rather a competition between earlier graduates and finalists from previous Fabrika Zyozd seasons.

The eighth season included four composers that had previously produced a season of the show: Igor Matvienko (one and five), Igor Krutoy (four), Viktor Drobysh (four and six), and Konstantin Meladze (seven). Each composer had three acts that they had previously produced for. As a result of Alexander Shulgin and Maxim Fadeev's non-participation, there were no competing acts from the second and third season of the show.

During the final, only the top three results were given alongside a Producer's Award, which was determined by the producers themselves. The producers were not allowed to vote for their own acts. Drobysh and Matvienko voted for Mark Tishmann, Meladze voted for Irina Dubtsova, and Krutoy voted for Chelsea.

The show received criticism for its judging panel, which at one moment drew straws to make a decision with regards to the elimination of one of the nominated contestants.

Fabrika Zvyozd: Russia-Ukraine (2012)
In 2012, there was a continuation of the 2011 project called Star Factory: Russia-Ukraine, in which the best graduates of the Russian and Ukrainian versions of the "Factory" competed.

National Team of Russia
 Polina Gagarina
 Victoria Dayneko
 Dominik Joker
 Dmitriy Koldun
 Vlad Sokolovskiy

National Team of Ukraine
 Max Barskih
 Eva Bushmina
 DiO.filmy
 Stas Shurins
 Erika

Producers: Igor Matvienko, Maxim Fadeev, Igor Krutoy, Viktor Drobysh, Konstantin Meladze, Natalia Mohylevska

Tenth season (2017)
After a hiatus from 2012 to 2017, a new 10th season was launched on Muz-TV. The premiere took place on September 2, 2017 [13]. The main show ran on Saturdays with diaries of the project broadcast on weekdays from Monday to Friday at three time slots per day. The show would be rebroadcast on Saturdays and Sundays on the alternative U channel (repetitions of the reporting concerts are broadcast on Saturdays at 11:00 and on Sundays at 22:00 on the "U" channel (Ю in Russian).
 
 Andrey Beletskiy
 Radoslava Boguslavskaya
 Elvira Brashchenkova
 Maria Budnitskaya
 Samvel Vardanyan
 Lolita Voloshina
 Daniil Danilevskiy
 Marta Zhdanuyk
 Elman Zeynalov
 Vladimir Idiatullin
 Nikita Kuznetsov
 Zinaida Kupriyanovich (Zina Kupriyanovich)
 Anna Saltykova (Anna Mun)
 Daniil Ruvinskiy
 Ulyana Sinetskaya
 Evgeniy Trofimov
 Gusel Khasanova
Producer: Victor Drobysh

Criticism, incidents and scandals
Throughout and especially after its runtime, Fabrika Zvyozd has received a large number of criticism. Russian composer and rock singer Alexander Gradsky was an early critic of the show, as well as Diana Arbenina.

Accusations of viewer deception
Several past fabrikanty and viewers have accused the show of being fake. In 2012, season two producer Maxim Fadeev revealed that Yelena Terleyeva had actually won the season but the producers preferred that Polina Gagarina would be crowned as the winner as she was "bright, prideful and spoke several languages".

2006 winner Dmitry Koldun said that producers initiated fights between contestants in the house. Next to that, Koldun stated that there had been only one vocal class in the whole sixteen weeks he spent at Fabrika Zvyozd, and that the producers used fragments of that one class throughout the series to deceive viewers that there were regular classes. Rita Dakota, who finished fourth in the seventh series, called the house "a prison" and said everything about the house they lived in was fake. During the live final of the sixth season, producer Viktor Drobysh promised all five finalists to give them 100,000 rubles (equivalent to $4,800.86 in 2021) each, but in the end, he did not pay.

In season six, a contestant named Prokhor Chaliapin made heads turn, telling audiences that he was a descendant of Feodor Chaliapin. In the end, this didn't turn out to be true. In 2013, it was revealed that Prokhor was neither a Chaliapin nor a Prokhor as his real name was revealed to be Andrei Zakharenkov. However, prior to applying to Fabrika Zvyozd, Zakharenkov had legally changed his name to Prokhor Chaliapin.

The show has received criticism for its extensive use for playback, including for the contestants that took part. Most of the songs that were performed on the stage were playbacked with prerecorded and edited vocals.

Accusations of nepotism
Fabrika Zvyozd has also received criticism for nepotism. Several contestants have been said to have been admitted to the show based on the fact that they had connections to the producers at that time.

Yulia Savicheva, who was a fabrikant in 2003, publicly admitted that she was promised a place on the show by producer Maxim Fadeev as they knew each other from previous efforts.

In the third season of 2003, one of the finalists of the show, Yulia Mikhailchik was revealed to be a romantic relantionship with the season's producer Alexander Shulgin since already before the show. During the show, Shulgin gave her more solo songs than any other contestant.

Poor treatment of contestants
In the fourth season of 2004, there was a food restriction on several female contestants who had started to gain weight.

In season 7, Rita Dakota was told "not to cry" and "not to downpour the mood in the house" after a family member had suddenly passed away. Dakota also spoke of a female contestant being harassed by other contestants for her skin colour and that the producers did not do anything about this.

In the tour that followed the sixth and seventh series, artists were reportedly underpaid and had to sustain in poor conditions. Several times, there was no place for the artists to sleep on tour and the tour managers did not provide the artists with food. Despite selling out large stadiums, the artists earned as little as 50$ a day. Several artists had gone on a strict diet to save money from the tour. The sleeping venues were often the cheapest hostels in the visited city. At one stage, the 2006 cohort resided in a drug clinic due to lack of hotel space. The 2007 cohort reportedly once slept in a psychiatric hospital and once on the floor of a shop.

Notes

References

External links
Official website 

 
Channel One Russia original programming
Russian music television series
2002 Russian television series debuts
2011 Russian television series endings
Star Academy